Filip Loftesnes-Bjune (born 5 April 2005) is a Norwegian footballer who plays as a midfielder for Sandefjord.

Career statistics

Club

Notes

References

2005 births
Living people
Sportspeople from Tønsberg
Norwegian footballers
Norway youth international footballers
Association football midfielders
Sandefjord Fotball players
Eliteserien players
Norwegian Fourth Division players